Hibbing High School is a public grade 7–12 high school in Hibbing, Minnesota, United States. The lavish Tudor Revival building was constructed at a cost of about $3.9 million, becoming known as the "castle in the woods" and—thanks to its polished brass fixtures—the "school with the golden doorknobs". The project was bankrolled by the mining industry, which wanted to make the move more palatable for those being displaced. It also satisfied immigrants' desire for their children's education.

Hibbing High School is listed on the National Register of Historic Places.  Visitors may tour the building on their own during the school year or on guided tours during the summer.

Amenities
The school features a lavishly decorated 1800-seat auditorium patterned after the Capitol Theatre in New York City. The chandeliers were built at a cost of $15,000 each, with cut glass from Belgium. They are now each insured for $250,000. The auditorium also contains a 1900-pipe organ from the Barton Organ Company, which can play any orchestra instrument except for the violin.

History
Hibbing High School received the Bellamy Award in 1968, an honor given to one school nationwide annually for outstanding academic achievements.

The school was listed on the National Register of Historic Places in 1980 for its state-level significance in the themes of architecture, education, industry, and politics/government.  It was nominated for its sumptuous Jacobethan architecture and association with the mutual desire by corporations and residents for improved public education as the mining industry mechanized.

On November 26, 1996 construction on a new addition to the building caused a fire. Although the fire was extinguished before it reached the original building, a significant amount of smoke damage had occurred. School had to be suspended for over a month while cleaning took place.

Notable alumni
Bob Dylan Nobel prize winner, singer-songwriter, author, and visual artist
Carl Mario D'Aquila, Minnesota politician
Dick Garmaker, basketball player
Delores J. Knaak, Minnesota politician
Kevin McHale, basketball player
Bethany McLean, journalist
Carly Melin, Minnesota politician
Scott Perunovich, ice hockey player
Julie Sandstede, Minnesota politician
Rudy Sikich, former football tackle
John J. Spanish, Minnesota politician

See also
 National Register of Historic Places listings in St. Louis County, Minnesota

References

External links
 Hibbing Public Schools

1920 establishments in Minnesota
Bob Dylan
Buildings and structures in Hibbing, Minnesota
National Register of Historic Places in St. Louis County, Minnesota
Public high schools in Minnesota
School buildings on the National Register of Historic Places in Minnesota
Schools in St. Louis County, Minnesota
Tourist attractions in St. Louis County, Minnesota
Tudor Revival architecture in Minnesota